Trophimus  (Tróphimos) or Trophimus the Ephesian (Tróphimos ho Ephésios) was a Christian who accompanied Paul during a part of his third missionary journey. He was with Paul in Jerusalem, and the Jews, supposing that the apostle had brought him into the temple, raised a tumult which resulted in Paul's imprisonment. (See Herod's Temple). In writing to Timothy, the apostle comments that he left Trophimus in Miletus due to illness. This must refer to some event not noticed in the Acts.

His feast is kept on 19 September.

Background
Trophimus and companion Tychicus are called "Asianoi", that is, natives of the Roman province of Asia (Acts 20:4). Making it still more definite, Trophimus is also termed an "Ephesian" and a "Gentile/Greek" in Acts 21.

Relation to Apostle Paul
Trophimus was one of eight friends (Acts 20:4), who accompanied Paul at the close of his third missionary journey and traveled with him from Greece, through Macedonia, into Asia, and onward by sea until Jerusalem was reached. Trophimus completed the journey with Paul, for, in the passages Acts 21:29, he is mentioned as being with Paul in Jerusalem immediately on the close of this journey.

Cause of Apostle Paul's Arrest
He was the innocent cause of Paul being assaulted in the courts of the temple by the Jewish mob, and then of his being arrested and imprisoned by the Romans. The occasion of this outrage was that the Jews supposed that Paul had "brought Greeks also into the temple, and....defiled this holy place" (Acts 21:28). The modicum of fact lying at the root of this false accusation was that they had seen Paul and Trophimus in each other's company in the city. On this slender basis "they supposed" that Paul had brought Trophimus past the barrier or middle wall of partition (Ephesians 2:14), beyond which no Gentile was allowed to penetrate, on pain of death.

Left at Miletus
Trophimus is also mentioned in 2 Timothy 4:20: "Trophimus I left at Miletus sick." This shows that he was again — several years after the date indicated in the previous passages — traveling with Paul on one of the missionary journeys which the apostle undertook after being liberated from his first imprisonment in Rome.

Unnamed brother
It has been conjectured that Trophimus is to be identified with the person mentioned in 2 Corinthians 8:16-24. There, Paul speaks in the highest terms of one of his companions whom he sent with Titus but does not provide his name. Titus and this disciple were evidently, those to whose care Paul entrusted the carrying of the Second Epistle to the Corinthians. The apostle says of this unnamed brother, not only that his praise is in the gospel throughout all the churches, but also that he was chosen by the churches to travel with him.

Relevant verses

References 

Seventy disciples
People in Acts of the Apostles
People in the Pauline epistles
Saints from Anatolia